Detalion S.C, was a Polish video game developer founded by a partnership of six people, that first met in the early 1990s (Maciej Miąsik, Robert Ożóg, Łukasz Pisarek, Krzysztof Bar, Roland Pantoła & Danuta Sienkowska), working from game developer and publisher LK Avalon.

These games (particularly Mysterious Journey: Schizm) were noted for the complexity and great difficulty of their puzzles, and also were hailed as having some of the best graphics in the industry at the time. Detalion was one of the first developers to use the DVD-ROM disc as an effective medium for software distribution.

After Detalion's disestablishment in 2005, its founders went on to create Detalion Games (basically a one-person shop, headed by Roland Pantola, which produced basic game concepts) and Detalion Arts (to work as an outsourcing studio doing various jobs, including for CD Projekt game The Witcher, until being purchased by City Interactive in 2007 and rebrand as City Interactive Rzeszów. In the same year, they started to work on Art of Murder series. In 2010, Detalion Games was working in Galander, an upcoming action game developed for PC but since then no more information was released about the game. In 2012, Roland Pantola from Detalion Games created a sister studio called Detalion Furniture to create innovative furniture design.

In 2018, after 15 years, Roland Pantola revealed that Schizm III: Nemezis is in development for Microsoft Windows through Detalion Games, using Unreal Engine 4 and will be published by PlayWay S.A. In Schizm III: Nemezis, you return to the beautiful planet of Argilus (original Schizm) as Amia and Bogard, two tourists hoping for an enjoyable and relaxing vacation. It was released on July 8, 2021.

V-Cruise Engine
V-Cruise engine was developed by Detalion for Microsoft Windows to provide immersive experience and ultra-smooth, fast and effective navigation between hundreds of locations of their games. V-Cruise engine provides full motion 25p 360 degree panoramic views.

Features
 Supports hardware accelerated 3D sound cards for full 360 degree sound positioning.
 CD quality music.

List of video games

References

External links
  A long interview about the history of Detalion and what happened to the team it consisted of (June 2008) at  Adventure Classic Gaming
 Detalion Home Page
 Article from adventuregamers.com about the closing of Detalion

Defunct video game companies of Poland
Video game companies established in 1998
Video game companies disestablished in 2005
Video game development companies